Temnora mirabilis is a moth of the family Sphingidae. It is known from Kenya and Rwanda.

The length of the forewings is about 27 mm. The forewing upperside ground colour is very dark brown or black with veins highlighted creamy-white. The antemedian and postmedian lines are also creamy-white and run continuous from the inner margin to the costa.

References

Temnora
Moths described in 1932
Moths of Africa